Hadassah: One Night with the King is a 2004 novel by Tommy Tenney and Mark Andrew Olsen based upon a retelling of the Biblical Book of Esther. It was made into a film released in 2006 in the United States. Tenney is one of the producers of the film.

See also

One Night With The King

2004 American novels
American novels adapted into films
Novels set in ancient Persia
Novels based on the Bible
Cultural depictions of Esther
Collaborative novels
Novels set in the 5th century BC